This article presents a list of Indian bands in Quebec. It lists all Indian bands recognized by Indian and Northern Affairs Canada which the seat is located in the province of Quebec, Canada.

List

See also
Aboriginal peoples in Quebec
Band government
First Nations

External links
First Nation Profiles by Indigenous and Northern Affairs Canada

 
Quebec-related lists